Éric Savin (born Dijon, 14 November 1964) is a French film and TV actor.

Biography 
Savin comes from a rugby family, which meant he was more interested in a sports career. But a strong conviction led him to Paris to try a career as an actor. He was a hospital agent at the Bichat hospital in Paris from 1985 to 1988, and then passed the (Drama school) Cours Florent free class competition. It was during an audition that he met Xavier Durringer (playwright , screenwriter and filmmaker) with whom he still works today.

He made his stage debut in 1989 in Lorenzaccio (written by Alfred de Musset) directed by Francis Huster. Bertrand Tavernier entrusted him with his first cinema role in 1992, as Inspector Lefort in L.627. He then alternated between theater, television and cinema. His first theatre successes came with Durringer's shows like La Petite Entaille in 1991, or Sureur in 1997, presented at the Avignon Festival.

In 1993, he starred with actress Karin Viard in La nage indienne (the Indian Swim), in the first feature film by Durringer. Then he had several supporting roles including Giordano in Emmène-moi (Take me) by Michel Spinosa, distinguished at the Berlin International Film Festival and Captain Conan again with Tavernier in 1996, followed by I Hate Love (J'ai horreur de l'amour) by Laurence Ferreira Barbosa in 1997 then in 1998 social film Une minute de silence ('One minute of silence') the first film of Florent Emilio Siri. He returned to work with Durringer on J'irai au paradis car l'enfer est ici (I'll go to heaven because hell is here) in 1997, film is about gangsters.

He gets a nomination to the Sept d'or for his portrayal of a divorced father who kidnaps his daughter in the TV movie Vacances volées (or Stolen Vacation), it was directed by Olivier Panchot.  He also accompanies many filmmakers and directors from short to feature film, such as Laurent Firode (Les astres (The Stars) in 1998, Happenstance (The Butterfly's Wing Flapping) in 2000), with Pierre-Erwan Guillaume in Bonne résistance à la douleur, (Good resistance to pain) in 1999 and L'Ennemi naturel (The Natural Enemy) in 2004. Then with Lyčče Boukhitine for which he takes the character in her short film La Vielle barrière (The old barrier), which won a 'jury prize' at the festival of Clermont-Ferrand in 1998. Finally in 2002, he plays in the famous short film Squash directed by Lionel Bailliu, which was multi-award-winning in several festivals around the world, including the interpretation prize in Clermont-Ferrand. Lionel Bailliu won an Oscar nomination in 2004 for Best Live Action Short Film. 
This performance leads Éric Savin to take the leading role of the compulsive domineering boss in the feature film adaptation in 2006 entitled Fair Play where he shares the poster with Marion Cotillard and Benoît Magimel.

Now occasionally called a chameleon actor, Éric Savin crosses many universes like those of Sébastien Lifshitz (The Cold lands (Telefilm in 1999), Presque rien (Almost nothing) in 2000, or Lætitia Colombani in À la folie... pas du tout (To the madness not at all) in 2002. He works again also in 2002, with Xavier Durringer for Quoi dire de plus du coq (The Ears on the back), a TV movie for Arte, adapted from a short story by Georges Arnaud (who wrote The Wages of Fear), a pursuit race across the Amazon. In the theater, he plays 'Franck Meyer' in duet with Zabou Breitman in Hilda, directed by Frédéric Belier-Garcia, at the Théâtre de l'Atelier, Paris. More recently at the cinema he played alongside the Cassel / Bellucci couple in Frédéric Schoendoerffer's Secret Agents in 2004.

In 2008, with over 80 roles to his credit, he shot the Scalp TV series for Canal +, where he played Raphael a rather complex trader in 8 episodes. At the same time, he was at the Théâtre La Bruyère, in Chocolat Piment written by Christine Reverho, directed by José Paul (five nominations at Molières), then recently in Sans mentir (Without a lie) by Xavier Daughreil at the Théâtre Tristan-Bernard, Paris.

He returns to cinema in the political thriller Une affaire d'État (A State affair) directed by Eric Valette in 2009, Copacabana by Marc Fitoussi in 2010, and Une pièce montée (Mounted Piece), adapted from the bestseller by Blandine Le Callet, a choral film bringing together several generations of actors and directed by Denys Granier-Deferre. As well as performing in Captifs, first feature film by Yann Gozlan in 2010, which won the grand prize of the Gérardmer 2007 International Fantastic Film Festival. 

He appeared in one episode of the short lived French TV series Clash as Daniel which was broadcast on France 2 in 2012.

In 2013, he directed his first short film Cadrage/débordement based on a man about play his first rugby match. He also starred in a sequel to Lady Bar (TV movie), Lady bar 2 directed by Xavier Durringer, set in Thailand.

In 2014, he is the very credible hierarchical superior sadistic of the subject heroine of Les Heures souterraines (The underground hours) a TV movie for Arte, directed by Philippe Harel taken from the eponymous novel by Delphine Le Vigan.

He appeared on The Chalet on France 2 which is now on Netflix.

In 2018, he returned to the stage for a play written by François Bégaudeau, Au Début at the Théâtre Le Petit Louvre in Avignon.

Filmography
1992 : L'Échappée belle directed by Antoine Vaton
1992 : L.627 by Bertrand Tavernier
1993 : La Nage indienne by Xavier Durringer
1994 : Emmène-moi by Michel Spinosa
1996 : Chacun cherche son chat by Cédric Klapisch
1997 : J'ai horreur de l'amour by Laurence Ferreira Barbosa
1997 : J'irai au paradis car l'enfer est ici by Xavier Durringer
1999 : Au cœur du mensonge by Claude Chabrol
1999 : Bonne résistance à la douleur (court-métrage) by Pierre-Erwan Guillaume
2000 : The Libertine by Gabriel Aghion
2000 : Presque rien by Sébastien Lifshitz
2000 : Le Battement d'ailes du papillon by Laurent Firode
2001 : Mes amis d'en France by Laurent Vinas-Raymond
2002 : À la folie... pas du tout by Lætitia Colombani
2004 : Secret Agents by Frédéric Schoendoerffer
2004 : L'Ennemi naturel by Pierre-Erwan Guillaume
2005 : Alex by José Alcala
2005 : Avant qu'il ne soit trop tard by Laurent Dussaux
2005 : Quartier V.I.P. by Laurent Firode
2005 : Léoléa by Nicolas Brossette
2006 : Fair Play by Lionel Bailliu
2006 : Tell No One by Guillaume Canet
2006 : Les Petites vacances by Olivier Peyon
2006 : La Vie d'artiste by Marc Fitoussi
2007 : Le Dernier Voyage by Frédéric Duvin (court métrage)
2007 : Intimate Enemies by Florent Emilio Siri
2007 : Anna M by Michel Spinosa
2008 : La différence c'est que c'est pas pareil by Pascal Laëthier : Pierre 
2009 : Une affaire d'État by Éric Valette
2010 : Pièce montée by Denys Granier-Deferre
2010 : Captifs by Yann Gozlan
2010 : Copacabana by Marc Fitoussi
2011 : Les Aventures de Philibert, capitaine puceau by Sylvain Fusée
2012 : My Way by Florent Emilio Siri
2012 : Mauvaise fille by Patrick Mille
2012 : Par amour by Laurent Firode
2013 : Denis by Lionel Bailliu
2013 : Les Reines du ring by Jean-Marc Rudnicki
2015 : A Perfect Man by Yann Gozlan
2015 : Elle by Paul Verhoeven
2016 : Vendeur by Sylvain Desclous
2017 : De toutes mes forces by Chad Chenouga
2021 : The Deep House by Julien Maury and Alexandre Bustillo : Pierre Montégnac

References

External links

French male actors
1964 births
Living people
Actors from Dijon